The Aero A.14 was a Czechoslovakian biplane military reconnaissance aircraft built in the 1920s. It was essentially a slightly modified version of the Hansa-Brandenburg C.I aircraft that Aero had built during World War I as the Ae.10, and for this reason, the aircraft is sometimes referred to as the A.14 Brandenburg. When equipped with a slightly different engine (the Hiero L in place of the standard Hiero N), the aircraft was designated A.15 instead. The two versions were otherwise almost identical.

Even though it was obsolete by the time it entered production in 1922, the A.14 is nevertheless noteworthy for its role in the establishment of Czech airline CSA. A.14s provided by the Czech Air Force served to survey routes that CSA airliners would soon fly, and at least 17 were put into service as mail planes between Prague and Bratislava. They could also carry a single passenger when required.

Specifications (A.14)

Operators
 Czechoslovakia
 CSA

See also

References

1920s Czechoslovakian mailplanes
1920s Czechoslovakian military reconnaissance aircraft
A014
Biplanes
Single-engined tractor aircraft